The Sydney Coliseum Theatre is a multi-mode lyric theatre in Rooty Hill, New South Wales, Australia, which opened in December 2019. It lies alongside Rooty Hill RSL Club, and was entirely funded by the organisation behind the club. 

The 2,200 seat auditorium can accommodate theatrical performances, corporate events, conferences and other attractions. Designed by Cox Architecture, it was built in just over two years. Its opening season featured Keith Urban, David Campbell, the Sydney Symphony Orchestra, Dame Edna Everage, Tina Arena, and John Butler.
	
It is part of West HQ, a precinct offering entertainment, fitness, lifestyle and accommodation in the Greater Western Sydney Region.

In 2022, filming of Australia's Got Talent and Australian Idol took place at the venue.

References 

Music venues in Sydney
Theatres in Sydney

City of Blacktown
Entertainment venues in New South Wales
Cultural infrastructure completed in 2019
Buildings and structures in Sydney
2019 establishments in Australia
Music venues completed in 2019
Theatres completed in 2019